VO2 may refer to:

 Vanadium(IV) oxide. a chemical compound
 VO2 max, the maximum rate of oxygen consumption as measured during incremental exercise